Ben Keating (born August 18, 1971) is an American amateur racing driver and business owner operating out of Victoria, Texas. Keating is the owner of 28 car auto dealerships across Texas, The Keating Auto Group. Since starting auto racing in 2006, he has competed in many auto races worldwide, including the 24 Hours of Le Mans, 24 Hours of Daytona, Twelve hours of Sebring, and most recently the World Endurance Championship. Keating began racing in 2006 after receiving a weekend track driving course as a Christmas present from his wife.

Business life

Ben Keating has been surrounded by the car industry his entire life. Growing up, he washed cars and parked them on the front line at the Ford dealership owned by his father, which provided Keating an inside look into the dynamics of auto dealerships. Keating eventually found himself in an internship at Service Group during his junior and senior years at Texas A&M University.

During his internship in Service Group, Keating trained staff and managers at multiple dealerships. In 1996 when he graduated from A&M with a degree in Engineering, Keating sold cars at Covert Ford in Austin, Texas. Soon after he became the Used Car Sales Manager at Tomball Ford and later became a minority owner.

Keating purchased Port Lavaca Ford in 2002. That was followed by Port Lavaca Dodge (2002) then Port Lavaca Chevrolet (2004). As of 2022 Keating owns 28 dealerships, generating about $3 billion in annual revenue and selling over 50,000 cars annually.

At each of his stores the general manager is also a minority partner of the business.

Racing

2022

IMSA 

 Rolex 24 at Daytona – 3rd Overall in Dpi Class with JDC Miller Motorsports in a Cadillac DPI
 12 Hours of Sebring – Started on Pole, Winner P1 with Mikkel Jensen and Scott Huffaker
 Sahlen’s 6 Hours at Watkins Glen – Started on Pole, Winner P1
 Michelin North American Endurance Cup – Winner P1

WEC 

 Sebring 1000 miles – Started on Pole, Finished P2
 Spa 6 Hour Race – Started on Pole, Finished P2
 24 Hours of Le Mans –  Started 19th, Finished WINNER P1 with Marco Sorensen and Henrique Chaves
 Monza 6 Hours – Started P2, DNF
 6 Hours of Fuji – Winner P1
 8 Hours of Bahrain – Clinched driver's championship in LMGTE Am class with Marco Sorensen and Henrique Chaves as first American to win a class title since the resurrection of WEC in 2012.

2021

IMSA

The LMP2 is in the classic WYNN’S livery. The team for LMP2 consists of Ben Keating, Mikkel Jensen, and Scott Huffaker.  

The LMP2 results as of Nov 14, 2021:

 Rolex 24 at Daytona, Started on the Pole, finished P7.  (Keating raced in two different cars for Rolex 24, LMP2, and Aston Martin)
 12 Hours of Sebring – Started 2nd, finished WINNER P1
 Sahlen's 6 Hours at Watkins Glen – Started at the back, finished P2
 Watkins Glen 240 – Started on the Pole, finished WINNER P1
 Road America – Started on the Pole, finished P3
 Laguna Seca - Started P7, finished WINNER P1
 Petit Le Mans - Started on the Pole, finished P2. (P1 at checkered flag, P2 after applying penalties post-race)

Ben and his team won the IMSA Championship and the Michelin North American Endurance Cup for LMP2.

WEC

Ben is competing in the World Endurance Championship (WEC) in an Aston Martin with TF Sport. The Aston Martin is running in the GT-Am class of the WEC. It is a GTE spec car. In the WEC, Ben's team is sponsored by 4HorsemenRacing.com and has a light blue livery. The team consists of Ben Keating, Dylan Pereira, and Felipe Fraga.

The WEC results as of Nov 07, 2021:

 Spa 6 Hour Race – Started on the Pole, finished P2
 Portimao 8 Hour race – started P11, finished P8
 Monza 6 Hour race – Started on the Pole, finished P14
 24 Hours of Le Mans – Started P6, finished P2
 Bahrain 6 Hour – Started P6, finished WINNER P1
 Bahrain 8 Hour – Started P5, retired

Ben and his team finished P2 in the WEC Championship for GT-Am.

Additional Races

In addition to these races, Keating participated in a Viper Days Reunion event at Road America during the August 26- 29th weekend and plans to race in the Intercontinental GT 8 Hour race at Indy in mid-October. Keating's team looks to repeat their win last year at the Indy 8hr in the Pro-Am class.

2019-2020

Keating decided to pull back on the IMSA series, choosing to join the FIA World Endurance Championship 2019–2020 season. He will also enter several IMSA races.  
Keating initially wanted to run his Ford GT in the WEC, but his entry request was denied. Keating then spoke with many teams but decided to join Team Project 1, having confirmed a full-season program alongside longtime partner Jeroen Bleekemolen and Felipe Fraga in the team's No. 57 Porsche 911 RSR. He had beat this team in Le Mans but was disqualified due to an issue with the car's fuel cell.

2019

Keating won his third consecutive IMSA Michelin Endurance Cup. He finished seventh in the GTD season and had a victory at Virginia International Raceway.
Also 2019, Keating became the first person to enter a Ford GT in Le Mans privately. The team placed 3rd but was later disqualified due to a capacity issue with the car's fuel cell.

2018

Keating won his second consecutive IMSA Michelin Endurance Cup GTD title. He finished third in the GTD championship by winning a victory at Canadian Tire Motorsports Park and two third-place runs at Laguna Seca and Sebring.

2017

Keating competed in the IMSA WeatherTech SportsCar Championship in a Mercedes AMG. He partnered with the Riley Motorsports Team. The car is a naturally-aspirated, 6.3-liter V8 Mercedes-AMG GT3 based on the Mercedes-AMG SLS road cars. They competed in the IMSA GT Daytona (GTD) class. 
2016
In December 2015, Viper Exchange announced they would again be sponsoring two Vipers in the 2016 running of the 24 Hours of Daytona. Keating will once again take shifts in both the No. 93 and No. 33 Vipers as he seeks to defend his 2015 victory. Keating will be joined in the No. 33 by Dominik Farnbacher, who helped drive the No. 93 to Daytona victory in 2015, and Le Mans co-drivers Marc Miller and Jeroen Bleekemolen. Keating will be joined in the No. 93 car by Trans-Am Series TA2 Champion Gar Robinson.

2016

Keating followed up on 2015's winning success with his most successful IMSA WeatherTech SportsCar Championship season yet in 2016. Racing the full season with Bleekemolen for the third-straight year, Keating once again kicked off the schedule with double duty in the season-opening Rolex 24 At Daytona. He and co-drivers Jeff Mosing, Eric Foss, Gar Robinson, and Damien Faulkner put the No. 93 Viper on the GTD-class podium for the second-straight year after the 2015 Daytona victory. The No. 93 gained three positions in the race's final hour for a third-place finish. Keating and the No. 33 team in turn recovered from a Saturday night accident to finish 10th, which made ViperExchange.com the only two-car GTD team in the Rolex 24 to place both of its entries in the top 10. Keating focused solely on the No. 33 Viper with Bleekemolen for the rest of the year after Daytona but encountered some tough going one race later in the 12 Hours of Sebring for the third year in a row. Bleekemolen led in the race's opening hour when the No. 33 suffered a rear stub axle failure. The entry returned after some lengthy repairs and soldiered home to a 12th-place finish with Marc Miller co-driving with Keating and Bleekemolen.

After great strategy and fast pit stops produced a sixth-place finish in Round 3 at Laguna Seca, Keating scored his first win of the year in Detroit. A popular victory in the hometown of the Viper, Keating stayed in touch with the lead pack throughout his race-opening stint after qualifying sixth, racing his way into the lead as the GTD field cycled through pit stops. Bleekemolen took over and kept the No. 33 upfront to the finish.

Keating, Bleekemolen, and the No. 33 team stayed competitive in the summer stretch of races that followed Detroit, frequently relying on great strategy and fast pit stops when the Viper didn't have the pace of other GTD cars within IMSA regulations. The run included fourth at Watkins Glen, 11th at Canadian Tire Motorsport Park, after a late contact incident while leading, and a third-place finish at Lime Rock Park. The year's second victory followed one race after Lime Rock at Road America, where Keating and Bleekemolen co-drove to the second-year-in-a-row victory. The win moved Keating, Bleekemolen, and ViperExchange.com to third in the GTD class point standings, putting them in contention for a solid championship finish for the first time.

A sixth-place finish at Virginia International Raceway kept Keating in the championship hunt. Despite a disappointing 13th-place result in his home race at Circuit of The Americas, Keating and the No. 33 team arrived at Road Atlanta second in points for the season-ending Petit Le Mans. Again co-driving with Miller, Keating and Bleekemolen did everything they could to gain a great result, starting from the pole and winning what would be the final race for a Viper in the IMSA GTD competition. Although the championship-winning Ferrari team build a big enough cushion to win the championship despite the No. 33 team's strong finish at Road Atlanta, Keating and company finished second in the team and driver GTD standings with 303 points, second only to the Ferrari's 330 points.

Now set to race a Mercedes-AMG GT3 in 2017, Keating brought a successful three-year run in the Viper GT3-R to a winning close at the Petit Le Mans 2016 finale. In total, Keating drove a Viper GT3-R to eight IMSA GTD race wins from 2014 to 2016.

The 2016 season also saw Keating compete in the 24 Hours of Le Mans for the second-straight year. After debuting in a GTE-Am class Viper GTS-R in 2015 with Bleekemolen and Miller, Keating switched to the LMP2 division in 2016, co-driving an open-top Nissan Oreca 03 with Bleekemolen and Marc Goossens. Despite a race-long string of issues, Keating finished Le Mans for the first time, driving the Oreca across the finish line for a 15th-place result in class.

The Sports Car Classic on Belle Isle: First Place GT Daytona (GTD) class victory.

Le Mans: Finished the 24 hours of Le Mans P35 overall and P15 in class after electronic issues in the Murphy Prototype.

2015

Keating started off the 2015 season pulling double-duty at the 2015 24 Hours of Daytona, taking turns in both the No. 93 and No. 33 Vipers. Keating would score his first win of the young season in the No. 93 Viper with previous Daytona co-drivers Dominik Farnbacher (2011–2013) and Kuno Wittmer (2013), along with American Al Carter. The No. 33 Viper would come in 9th in the event. Keating would drive in both cars again in the subsequent race, the 2015 12 Hours of Sebring, guiding the No. 93 car (with Carter and Belgian Marc Goossens) to a Top Five finish. The No. 33 Viper (with Jeroen and Sebastiaan Bleekemolen) would again come in 9th after a radiator issue late in the race knocked the car out of the lead. After Sebring, a string of technical and track issues befell Keating and the No. 33 car. Early in Keating's opening shift of the 2015 Monterey Grand Prix, a storm drain grate that was jutting out of the track did massive damage to the right side of the Viper, forcing significant repairs and knocking the No. 33 out of contention. The No. 33 car was then forced to pit for significant repairs early at Belle Isle after damage to the oil tank. Keating and Bleekemolen would experience another early issue at the 2015 Six Hours of The Glen, but were able to recover and finish the race in the 6th place overall. Running a full race without any stops for repairs, Keating and Bleekemolen rebounded with a second-place finish at the 2015 Northeast Grand Prix, finishing just three and a half seconds behind the leader. Keating and Bleekemolen followed up with another strong performance and snagged their first class win of the year in the Continental Tire Road Race Showcase at Road America. As a result of their win at Road America, the No. 33 car was placed under some competitive restrictions limiting the performance of the car during the next race, the Oak Tree Grand Prix at VIR. These restrictions limited the No. 33 Viper to a 7th-place finish, preventing Keating from taking a third consecutive podium. Keating and Bleekemolen would come back strong though, and charged back into the winner's circle with a come-from-behind victory at Circuit of the Americas. Keating was hit with a penalty early, but strong driving from him and Jeroen allowed them to overcome that setback and take the victory. For the season's final race, the 2015 Petit Le Mans at Road Atlanta, Sebastiaan Bleekemolen joined Keating and brother Jeroen in the No. 33 Viper. Unfortunately, Keating's early spin-out on the rain-soaked track resulted in a lap deficit the team could not overcome, and the No. 33 car finished 12th in class. However, Keating's late season push of three podiums and two wins in the last five events were enough to help overcome the No. 33 team's early troubles, and Keating  and Bleekemolen finished in 6th place in the points standings for the GTD Class.

2014 

After the American Le Mans Series merged into the Rolex Sports Car Series after the 2013 season, Keating participated in the 2014 Tudor United SportsCar Championship season. Keating joined with Dutch siblings Jeroen and  Sebastiaan Bleekemolen in the No. 33 Dodge Viper GT3-R for Riley Motorsports. Joined by French driver Emmanuel Collard, Keating and the Bleekemolen brothers competed in the opening event, the 24 Hours of Daytona, completing 615 laps over the day-long event, finishing 19th (40th overall). During the subsequent event, the Twelve Hours of Sebring, Keating was driving the No. 33 Viper on the 13th lap when the Viper's driveshaft disconnect from the rear axle, severing a fuel line and starting a fire. After noticing the fire, Keating was able to stop and exit the vehicle without injury, although the team was forced to retire from the race. The No. 33 car was up and running again under 2 months later for the event at Laguna Seca, as Keating and Jeroen Bleekemolen completed the 2 hour race. Keating and Jeroen recorded their first win of the series three races later at the SportsCar Grand Prix. They would go on to record Top Five finishes in the next two races, placing third in the Brickyard Grand Prix (Indianapolis Motor Speedway) and fourth in the Road America 500. Keating would record his second win of the season with a win at his home-state event at the Circuit of the Americas. The two wins, combined with his two top 5 finishes, propelled Keating into 14th place in the final driver points standings, despite his misfortune at Sebring.

Viper Racing League and NARRA

Keating began racing in 2006 after receiving a weekend track driving course as a Christmas present from his wife. In 2006, he began racing a 2000 Dodge Viper GTS in the Viper Racing League (VRL), a league that began as track days for Viper enthusiasts. Keating received a DNF in his first race, an event at Sebring International Raceway. In 2007 Keating participated in the full VRL series and in 2008, his second full year in the league, Keating won the VRL National Championship. After the 2008 season, the VRL reorganized into the North American Road Racing Association.

In 2009, Keating participated in the NARRA US GT Championship, a 13-round series at 7 venues across the Continental United States. Driving a Viper Competition Coupe, Keating claimed the national championship. He would repeat this feat in 2010.

In 2010 Keating also began racing in a new NARRA-sponsored event, the 5-city, 10-race Dodge Viper Cup. Driving the specially designed Viper ACR-X, Keating finished 2nd in the inaugural Viper Cup with race wins at Virginia International Raceway and  Pocono Raceway. Keating finished the series with 501 points, 106 points behind first place. During the 2011 Viper Cup, Keating would record 4 race wins (New Jersey Motorsports Park, Virginia International Raceway, Texas World Speedway and Daytona). Going into the final race of the season Keating held a 58-point advantage in the Viper Cup standings (a win being worth 60), and claimed the national championship by 20 points despite being forced into 15th place by a late-race collision. In 2012 Keating would dominate the series and repeat as national champion, recording 6 wins (Road Atlanta (both races), Road America (both races), Monticello Motor Club, and Watkins Glen) as well as three other top 5 finishes.

Rolex Sports Car Series

Keating made his Rolex Sports Car Series debut at the Rolex 24 Hours of Daytona in 2011, racing in the Viper Exchange.com No. 66 Porsche 911 GT3 Cup. Racing for The Racer's Group (TRG), Keating and co-drivers Dominik Farnbacher, Tim George Jr. and Lucas Luhr placed 13th in their class (27th Overall), completing 612 laps with a total time of  21:40:37.038.

The following year, Keating participated in a full season of the North American Endurance Championship, a subset of the Rolex Sports Car Series consisting of three races: the Rolex 24 Hours of Daytona, the Six Hours of The Glen, and the Brickyard Grand Prix at Indianapolis Motor Speedway. Keating drove the No. 66 Porsche in all three races. Keating pulled double-duty during the 2012 24 Hours of Daytona, also taking a shift in  The Racer's Group's No. 68 Porsche GT3 Cup.

Keating would participate in the Rolex 24 Hours of Daytona again in 2013, driving the No. 66 car along with co-drivers Farnbacher, Kuno Wittmer, and Jorg Bergmeister. They would go on to place 20th in class (31st overall), completing 622 laps with a time of 23:57:15.712.

American Le Mans Series

In 2013, Keating made the jump into the American Le Mans Series, competing in the series' final season. Keating, with co-drivers Damien Faulkner and Craig Stanton in the No. 66 Porsche, would finish 5th in the GT-challenge (GTC) class in the series' opening event, the 12 Hours of Sebring. Keating would continue to race with Faulkner for most of the series. On September 21, Keating and Faulkner would score their first victory of the season at the Circuit of the Americas in Austin, Texas. In front of his friends and family from around Texas, Keating drove the first 70 minutes of the race, then handed off to Faulkner, who completed the victory with a winning margin of 12.94 seconds. Keating and Faulkner followed their first victory up with another winning effort at Virginia International Raceway. The two late-season victories would prove a boon to Keating's final position in the standings, providing him with 40 of his 84 total points and earning him an 8th-place finish in the GTC class (out of 46 drivers).

WeatherTech SportsCar Championship

After the American Le Mans Series merged into the Rolex Sports Car Series after the 2013 season, Keating participated in the 2014 Tudor United SportsCar Championship season. Keating joined with Dutch siblings Jeroen and  Sebastiaan Bleekemolen in the No. 33 Dodge Viper GT3-R for Riley Motorsports. Joined by French driver Emmanuel Collard, Keating and the Bleekemolen brothers competed in the opening event, the 24 Hours of Daytona, completing 615 laps over the day-long event, finishing 19th (40th overall). During the subsequent event, the Twelve Hours of Sebring, Keating was driving the No. 33 Viper on the 13th lap when the Viper's driveshaft disconnect from the rear axle, severing a fuel line and starting a fire. After noticing the fire, Keating was able to stop and exit the vehicle without injury, although the team was forced to retire from the race. The No. 33 car was up and running again under 2 months later for the event at Laguna Seca, as Keating and Jeroen Bleekemolen completed the 2 hour race. Keating and Jeroen recorded their first win of the series three races later at the SportsCar Grand Prix. They would go on to record Top Five finishes in the next two races, placing third in the Brickyard Grand Prix (Indianapolis Motor Speedway) and fourth in the Road America 500. Keating would record his second win of the season with a win at his home-state event at the Circuit of the Americas. The two wins, combined with his two top 5 finishes, propelled Keating into 14th place in the final driver points standings, despite his misfortune at Sebring.

Complete WeatherTech SportsCar Championship results
(key) (Races in bold indicate pole position; races in italics indicate fastest lap)

24 Hours of Le Mans

24 Hours of Le Mans

On April 16, 2015, the Automobile Club de l'Ouest announced that the Viper Exchange.com/Riley Motorsports entry into the 2015 24 Hours of Le Mans had been approved, with American Marc Miller joining Keating and Jeroen Bleekemolen as co-driver. The team will drive the No. 53 Dodge Viper GTS-R in the GTE Am class. The team was first among the reserves for the event, and the entry gives Keating the opportunity to accomplish the feat of winning both the 24 Hours of Daytona and the 24 Hours of Le Mans events in the same year. This will be the first 24 Hours of Le Mans for both Keating and Miller, while Jeroen will be earning his 10th consecutive start in the event. Jeroen finished fourth in class in qualifying, and so the team had good position for the start of the race. Bleekemolen continued the strong start with his opening shift in the car, leading for most of the third hour, and Keating continued to maintain a top-four position during the second shift. Miller took the third shift through much of the night, and the team entered the final shift, again driven by Bleekemolen, in fifth place. However, Bleekemolen began to notice issues with the gearbox. After replacing the gearbox failed to resolve the problems, the No. 53 car was forced to retire from the race at 13:45, having completed 304 laps.
Keating continued to race at Le Mans in 2016, 2017, 2019, and 2020.

24 Hours of Le Mans results

Partnership with VLF Automotive

Origins
VLF Automotive is a joint venture between designer Henrik Fisker, former GM Vice Chair Bob Lutz and manufacturer Gilbert Villarreal. Lutz and Villarreal began VL automotive in 2012, and in 2013 unveiled the VL Destino, a luxury automobile based on Fisker's Karma electric car. However, VL did away with the Karma's fully electric powertrain and replaced it with the 6.2L V8 GM engine used in the Chevrolet Corvette ZR1. Eventually Fisker joined the team, which then became VLF automotive. VLF then began work on a new automobile built around the 8.4L V10 of the Dodge Viper, which would become the Force 1 V10.

Keating and the Force 1
Fisker and Keating met in 2015 and quickly developed a partnership, combining Fisker's legendary designs with Keating's extensive expertise with performance vehicles, particularly his intimate knowledge of the Dodge Viper. In particular, Keating helped design the active suspension used in the Force 1 V10 using his decade of experience racing Vipers to tune the suspension for both on-the-road and on-the-track needs. As part of the partnership, the first run of the Force 1 V10, totaling 50 cars, will be sold entirely through Keating's Viper Exchange dealership.

References

1971 births
24 Hours of Le Mans drivers
American racing drivers
Living people
24 Hours of Daytona drivers
24H Series drivers
American Le Mans Series drivers
Rolex Sports Car Series drivers
WeatherTech SportsCar Championship drivers
FIA World Endurance Championship drivers
European Le Mans Series drivers
Murphy Prototypes drivers
JDC Motorsports drivers
Mercedes-AMG Motorsport drivers
Starworks Motorsport drivers
Racing drivers from Houston
Racing drivers from Texas
Le Mans Cup drivers
Corvette Racing drivers